The Netherlands Chinese Evangelization Society was a Dutch Protestant Christian missionary society that was involved in sending workers to China during the late Qing dynasty. It was founded by Karl Gützlaff.

References

Notes

See also
The Chinese Evangelization Society (British)
Protestant missionary societies in China during the 19th Century

Christian missionary societies
Christian missions in China
China–Netherlands relations